The following is a partial list of the "C" codes for Medical Subject Headings (MeSH), as defined by the United States National Library of Medicine (NLM).

This list continues the information at List of MeSH codes (C05). Codes following these are found at List of MeSH codes (C07). For other MeSH codes, see List of MeSH codes.

The source for this content is the set of 2006 MeSH Trees from the NLM.

– digestive system diseases

– biliary tract diseases

– bile duct diseases
  – bile duct neoplasms
  – common bile duct neoplasms
  – biliary atresia
  – choledochal cyst
  – caroli disease
  – cholestasis
  – cholestasis, extrahepatic
  – cholestasis, intrahepatic
  – alagille syndrome
  – liver cirrhosis, biliary
  – cholangitis
  – cholangitis, sclerosing
  – common bile duct diseases
  – biliary dyskinesia
  – sphincter of oddi dysfunction
  – choledocholithiasis
  – common bile duct neoplasms

– bile reflux

– biliary tract neoplasms
  – bile duct neoplasms
  – common bile duct neoplasms
  – gallbladder neoplasms

– cholelithiasis
  – cholecystolithiasis
  – choledocholithiasis

– gallbladder diseases
  – cholecystitis
  – acalculous cholecystitis
  – cholecystitis, acute
  – emphysematous cholecystitis
  – cholecystolithiasis
  – gallbladder neoplasms

– postcholecystectomy syndrome

– digestive system abnormalities

– anus, imperforate

– barrett esophagus

– biliary atresia

– choledochal cyst
  – caroli disease

– diaphragmatic eventration

– esophageal atresia

– hirschsprung disease

– intestinal atresia

– meckel diverticulum

– digestive system fistula

– biliary fistula

– esophageal fistula
  – tracheoesophageal fistula

– gastric fistula

– intestinal fistula
  – rectal fistula
  – rectovaginal fistula

– pancreatic fistula

– digestive system neoplasms

– biliary tract neoplasms
  – bile duct neoplasms
  – common bile duct neoplasms
  – gallbladder neoplasms

– gastrointestinal neoplasms
  – esophageal neoplasms
  – gastrointestinal stromal tumors
  – intestinal neoplasms
  – cecal neoplasms
  – appendiceal neoplasms
  – colorectal neoplasms
  – colonic neoplasms
  – adenomatous polyposis coli
  – gardner syndrome
  – sigmoid neoplasms
  – colorectal neoplasms, hereditary nonpolyposis
  – rectal neoplasms
  – anus neoplasms
  – anal gland neoplasms
  – duodenal neoplasms
  – ileal neoplasms
  – immunoproliferative small intestinal disease
  – jejunal neoplasms
  – stomach neoplasms
  – zollinger-ellison syndrome

– liver neoplasms
  – adenoma, liver cell
  – carcinoma, hepatocellular
  – liver neoplasms, experimental

– pancreatic neoplasms
  – adenoma, islet cell
  – insulinoma
  – carcinoma, islet cell
  – gastrinoma
  – glucagonoma
  – somatostatinoma
  – vipoma
  – carcinoma, pancreatic ductal

– peritoneal neoplasms

– gastrointestinal diseases

– esophageal diseases
  – barrett esophagus
  – deglutition disorders
  – esophageal motility disorders
  – crest syndrome
  – esophageal achalasia
  – esophageal spasm, diffuse
  – gastroesophageal reflux
  – plummer-vinson syndrome
  – diverticulosis, esophageal
  – esophageal and gastric varices
  – esophageal atresia
  – esophageal cyst
  – esophageal fistula
  – tracheoesophageal fistula
  – esophageal neoplasms
  – esophageal perforation
  – mallory-weiss syndrome
  – esophageal stenosis
  – esophagitis
  – esophagitis, peptic

– gastroenteritis
  – appendicitis
  – cholera morbus
  – colitis
  – colitis, ischemic
  – colitis, microscopic
  – colitis, collagenous
  – colitis, lymphocytic
  – colitis, ulcerative
  – proctocolitis
  – dysentery
  – dysentery, amebic
  – dysentery, bacillary
  – enteritis
  – duodenitis
  – ileitis
  – pouchitis
  – enterocolitis
  – enterocolitis, necrotizing
  – enterocolitis, neutropenic
  – enterocolitis, pseudomembranous
  – esophagitis
  – esophagitis, peptic
  – gastritis
  – gastritis, atrophic
  – gastritis, hypertrophic
  – inflammatory bowel diseases
  – colitis, ulcerative
  – crohn disease
  – mucositis
  – proctitis
  – proctocolitis

– gastrointestinal neoplasms
  – esophageal neoplasms
  – gastrointestinal stromal tumors
  – intestinal neoplasms
  – cecal neoplasms
  – appendiceal neoplasms
  – colorectal neoplasms
  – colonic neoplasms
  – adenomatous polyposis coli
  – gardner syndrome
  – sigmoid neoplasms
  – colorectal neoplasms, hereditary nonpolyposis
  – rectal neoplasms
  – anus neoplasms
  – anal gland neoplasms
  – duodenal neoplasms
  – ileal neoplasms
  – immunoproliferative small intestinal disease
  – jejunal neoplasms
  – stomach neoplasms
  – zollinger-ellison syndrome

– hernia
  – hernia, abdominal
  – gastroschisis
  – hernia, femoral
  – hernia, inguinal
  – hernia, ventral
  – hernia, umbilical
  – hernia, diaphragmatic
  – hernia, diaphragmatic, traumatic
  – hernia, hiatal
  – hernia, obturator

– intestinal diseases
  – cecal diseases
  – appendicitis
  – cecal neoplasms
  – appendiceal neoplasms
  – colonic diseases
  – colitis
  – colitis, ischemic
  – colitis, microscopic
  – colitis, collagenous
  – colitis, lymphocytic
  – colitis, ulcerative
  – proctocolitis
  – colonic diseases, functional
  – colonic pseudo-obstruction
  – irritable bowel syndrome
  – colorectal neoplasms
  – colonic neoplasms
  – adenomatous polyposis coli
  – gardner syndrome
  – sigmoid neoplasms
  – colorectal neoplasms, hereditary nonpolyposis
  – diverticulosis, colonic
  – diverticulitis, colonic
  – megacolon
  – hirschsprung disease
  – megacolon, toxic
  – sigmoid diseases
  – proctocolitis
  – sigmoid neoplasms
  – duodenal diseases
  – duodenal neoplasms
  – duodenal obstruction
  – superior mesenteric artery syndrome
  – duodenitis
  – duodenogastric reflux
  – peptic ulcer
  – duodenal ulcer
  – peptic ulcer perforation
  – dysentery
  – dysentery, amebic
  – dysentery, bacillary
  – enteritis
  – duodenitis
  – ileitis
  – pouchitis
  – enterocolitis
  – enterocolitis, necrotizing
  – enterocolitis, neutropenic
  – enterocolitis, pseudomembranous
  – hiv enteropathy
  – ileal diseases
  – ileal neoplasms
  – ileitis
  – pouchitis
  – inflammatory bowel diseases
  – colitis, ulcerative
  – crohn disease
  – intestinal atresia
  – intestinal diseases, parasitic
  – anisakiasis
  – balantidiasis
  – blastocystis infections
  – cryptosporidiosis
  – dientamoebiasis
  – dysentery, amebic
  – giardiasis
  – intestinal fistula
  – rectal fistula
  – rectovaginal fistula
  – intestinal neoplasms
  – cecal neoplasms
  – appendiceal neoplasms
  – colorectal neoplasms
  – colonic neoplasms
  – adenomatous polyposis coli
  – gardner syndrome
  – sigmoid neoplasms
  – colorectal neoplasms, hereditary nonpolyposis
  – rectal neoplasms
  – anus neoplasms
  – anal gland neoplasms
  – duodenal neoplasms
  – ileal neoplasms
  – immunoproliferative small intestinal disease
  – jejunal neoplasms
  – intestinal obstruction
  – afferent loop syndrome
  – duodenal obstruction
  – fecal impaction
  – ileus
  – intestinal pseudo-obstruction
  – colonic pseudo-obstruction
  – intestinal volvulus
  – intussusception
  – intestinal perforation
  – intestinal polyposis
  – adenomatous polyposis coli
  – gardner syndrome
  – peutz-jeghers syndrome
  – jejunal diseases
  – jejunal neoplasms
  – malabsorption syndromes
  – blind loop syndrome
  – celiac disease
  – lactose intolerance
  – short bowel syndrome
  – sprue, tropical
  – steatorrhea
  – whipple disease
  – mesenteric vascular occlusion
  – pneumatosis cystoides intestinalis
  – protein-losing enteropathies
  – rectal diseases
  – anus diseases
  – anus neoplasms
  – anal gland neoplasms
  – fissure in ano
  – pruritus ani
  – colorectal neoplasms
  – rectal neoplasms
  – anus neoplasms
  – anal gland neoplasms
  – fecal incontinence
  – hemorrhoids
  – proctitis
  – proctocolitis
  – rectal fistula
  – rectovaginal fistula
  – rectal prolapse
  – rectocele
  – zollinger-ellison syndrome

– peptic ulcer
  – duodenal ulcer
  – esophagitis, peptic
  – peptic ulcer perforation
  – stomach ulcer
  – zollinger-ellison syndrome

– stomach diseases
  – achlorhydria
  – diverticulosis, stomach
  – duodenogastric reflux
  – bile reflux
  – gastric antral vascular ectasia
  – gastric dilatation
  – gastric outlet obstruction
  – pyloric stenosis
  – pyloric stenosis, hypertrophic
  – gastritis
  – gastritis, atrophic
  – gastritis, hypertrophic
  – gastroparesis
  – peptic ulcer
  – peptic ulcer perforation
  – stomach ulcer
  – postgastrectomy syndromes
  – dumping syndrome
  – stomach neoplasms
  – stomach rupture
  – stomach volvulus
  – zollinger-ellison syndrome

– tuberculosis, gastrointestinal

– visceral prolapse

– liver diseases

– cholestasis, intrahepatic
  – alagille syndrome
  – liver cirrhosis, biliary

– fatty liver
  – fatty liver, alcoholic
  – reye syndrome

– focal nodular hyperplasia

– hepatic insufficiency
  – liver failure
  – hepatic encephalopathy
  – liver failure, acute
  – massive hepatic necrosis

– hepatic vein thrombosis

– hepatic veno-occlusive disease

– hepatitis
  – hepatitis, alcoholic
  – hepatitis, animal
  – hepatitis, viral, animal
  – hepatitis, infectious canine
  – rift valley fever
  – hepatitis, chronic
  – hepatitis, autoimmune
  – hepatitis b, chronic
  – hepatitis c, chronic
  – hepatitis, chronic, drug-induced
  – hepatitis d, chronic
  – hepatitis, toxic
  – hepatitis, chronic, drug-induced
  – hepatitis, viral, human
  – hepatitis a
  – hepatitis b
  – hepatitis b, chronic
  – hepatitis c
  – hepatitis c, chronic
  – hepatitis d
  – hepatitis d, chronic
  – hepatitis e

– hepatolenticular degeneration

– hepatopulmonary syndrome

– hepatorenal syndrome

– hypertension, portal
  – esophageal and gastric varices

– liver abscess
  – liver abscess, amebic
  – liver abscess, pyogenic

– liver cirrhosis
  – liver cirrhosis, alcoholic
  – liver cirrhosis, biliary
  – liver cirrhosis, experimental

– liver diseases, alcoholic
  – fatty liver, alcoholic
  – hepatitis, alcoholic
  – liver cirrhosis, alcoholic

– liver diseases, parasitic
  – echinococcosis, hepatic
  – fascioliasis
  – liver abscess, amebic

– liver neoplasms
  – adenoma, liver cell
  – carcinoma, hepatocellular
  – liver neoplasms, experimental

– peliosis hepatis

– porphyrias, hepatic
  – coproporphyria, hereditary
  – porphyria, acute intermittent
  – porphyria cutanea tarda
  – porphyria, hepatoerythropoietic
  – porphyria, variegate
  – protoporphyria, erythropoietic

– tuberculosis, hepatic

– zellweger syndrome

– pancreatic diseases

– cystic fibrosis

– exocrine pancreatic insufficiency

– nesidioblastosis

– pancreatic cyst
  – pancreatic pseudocyst

– pancreatic fistula

– pancreatic neoplasms
  – adenoma, islet cell
  – insulinoma
  – carcinoma, islet cell
  – gastrinoma
  – glucagonoma
  – somatostatinoma
  – vipoma
  – carcinoma, pancreatic ductal

– pancreatitis
  – pancreatitis, acute necrotizing
  – pancreatitis, alcoholic
  – pancreatitis, chronic

– peritoneal diseases

– chylous ascites

– hemoperitoneum

– mesenteric lymphadenitis

– mesenteric vascular occlusion

– panniculitis, peritoneal

– peritoneal neoplasms
  – mesenteric cyst

– peritonitis
  – peritonitis, tuberculous
  – subphrenic abscess

– pneumoperitoneum

The list continues at List of MeSH codes (C07).

C06